Heosphora psamathella is a moth in the family Pyralidae. The species was first described by Edward Meyrick in 1879, as Anerastia psamathella, from a male specimen collected in Sydney, New South Wales, and was moved to the genus Heosphora as its type species by  George Hampson in 1901.  It is found in Australia.

References 

Moths described in 1879
Moths of Australia
Taxa named by Edward Meyrick